Nezpercius is an extinct genus of prehistoric amphibian.

References

Cretaceous amphibians of North America
Fossil taxa described in 2001